Otites gradualis is a species of ulidiid or picture-winged fly in the genus Otites of the family Ulidiidae.

References

gradualis
Insects described in 1998
Diptera of Europe